The white-rimmed warbler or white-browed warbler (Myiothlypis leucoblephara) is a species of bird in the family Parulidae.
It is found in Argentina, Brazil, Paraguay, and Uruguay.
Its natural habitats are subtropical or tropical moist lowland forests, subtropical or tropical moist montane forests, subtropical or tropical moist shrubland, and heavily degraded former forest.

References

white-rimmed warbler
Birds of Brazil
Birds of the Selva Misionera
Birds of the South Region
Birds of Uruguay
white-rimmed warbler
Taxa named by Louis Jean Pierre Vieillot
Taxonomy articles created by Polbot